Janet Flanner (March 13, 1892 – November 7, 1978) was an American writer and pioneering narrative journalist  who served as the Paris correspondent of The New Yorker magazine from 1925 until she retired in 1975. She wrote under the pen name "Genêt". She also published a single novel, The Cubical City, set in New York City. She was a prominent member of America's expatriate community living in Paris before WWII. Along with her longtime partner Solita Solano, Flanner was called "a defining force in the creative expat scene in Paris." She returned to New York during the war and split her time between there and Paris until her death in 1978.

Early life
Janet Flanner was born in Indianapolis, Indiana, to Frank and Mary Ellen Flanner (née Hockett), a child of Quakers. She had two sisters, Marie and Hildegarde Flanner. Her father co-owned a mortuary and ran the first crematorium in the state of Indiana. After a period spent traveling abroad with her family and studies at Tudor Hall School for Girls (now Park Tudor School), she enrolled in the University of Chicago in 1912, leaving the university in 1914. Two years later, she returned to her native city to take up a post as the first cinema critic on the local paper, the Indianapolis Star.

Expatriate in Paris
While in New York, Flanner moved in the circle of the Algonquin Round Table, but was not a member. She also met the couple Jane Grant and Harold Ross, through painter Neysa McMein. It was based on this connection that Harold Ross offered Flanner the position of French Correspondent to The New Yorker.

After these early years spent in Pennsylvania and New York in her mid twenties, Flanner left the United States for Paris.

In September 1925 Flanner published her first "Letter from Paris" in The New Yorker, which had been launched the previous February, and with which she would be professionally linked for the next five decades. Her columns covered a wide range of topics, including artists, performances, and crime, including a lengthy feature on murderesses Christine and Léa Papin. She also published several installments about the Stavisky Affair. Flanner was also known for her obituaries—examples include those of Isadora Duncan and Edith Wharton. Flanner had first come to the attention of editor Harold Ross through his first wife, Jane Grant, who was a friend of Flanner's from the Lucy Stone League, an organization that fought for women to preserve their maiden names after marriage, in the manner of Lucy Stone. Flanner joined the group in 1921. Ross famously thought Flanner's pen name "Genêt" was French for "Janet".

Flanner authored one novel, The Cubical City (1926), which achieved little success.

Flanner was a prominent member of the American expatriate community which included Ernest Hemingway, F. Scott Fitzgerald, John Dos Passos, e. e. cummings, Hart Crane, Djuna Barnes, Ezra Pound, and Gertrude Stein—the world of the Lost Generation and Les Deux Magots. While in Paris she became very close friends with Gertrude Stein and her lover, Alice B. Toklas.

She played a crucial role in introducing her contemporaries to new artists in Paris, including Pablo Picasso, Georges Braque, Henri Matisse, André Gide, Jean Cocteau, and the Ballets Russes, as well as crime passionel and vernissage, the triumphant crossing of the Atlantic Ocean by Charles Lindbergh and the depravities of the Stavisky Affair.

Her prose style has since come to epitomise the "New Yorker style"—its influence can be seen decades later in the prose of Bruce Chatwin. An example: "The late Jean De Koven was an average American tourist in Paris but for two exceptions: she never set foot in the Opéra, and she was murdered."

War correspondent
Her New Yorker work during World War II included not only her famous "Letter from Paris" columns, but also included a seminal 3-part series profiling Hitler (1936).

After Hitler invaded Poland on September 1, 1939, Flanner moved back to New York City, living with Natalia Danesi Murray and her son William Murray, still writing for The New Yorker, analyzing radio broadcasts and print reports about life in wartime Paris. She returned to Paris in 1944, contributing a series of  weekly radio broadcasts entitled "Listen: the Women" for the Blue Network during the months following the liberation of Paris in late August 1944.

Flanner covered the Nuremberg trials (1945) for The New Yorker.

Post-war 
She covered the Suez crisis, the Soviet invasion of Hungary, and the strife in Algeria which led to the rise of Charles de Gaulle.

Awards and recognitions
In 1948, Flanner was made a knight of Legion d'Honneur.

In 1958, Flanner was awarded an honorary doctorate by Smith College.

In 1966. she won the U.S. National Book Award in the Arts and Letters category for her Paris Journal, 1944–1965. Extracts of her Paris Journal were turned into a piece for chorus and orchestra by composer Ned Rorem.

In 1971, she was the third guest during the infamous verbal scuffle between Gore Vidal and Norman Mailer on The Dick Cavett Show, getting in between the two after a drunken Mailer started insulting his fellow guests and their host.

In 2019, Park Tudor School — the school that formed after Tudor Hall for Girls (Flanner's alma mater) merged with a nearby boys school — posthumously awarded her their prestigious "distinguished alumni award." The school's fine arts department also created a speaker series in her name, titled the "Janet Flanner Visiting Artist Series."

Marriage and personal life

In 1918, she married William "Lane" Rehm, a friend she had met while at the University of Chicago. He was then an artist in New York City, and she later admitted that she married him to get out of Indianapolis. The marriage lasted for only a few years and they divorced amicably in 1926. Rehm was supportive of Flanner's career until his death.

In 1918, the same year she married her husband, she met Solita Solano in Greenwich Village, and the two became lifelong lovers, although both became involved with other lovers throughout their relationship. Solano was drama editor for the New-York Tribune, and also wrote for National Geographic.

In 1932 she fell in love with Noël Haskins Murphy, an American singer who lived in a village just outside Paris. They had a short-lived romance. This did not affect her relationship with Solano.

Flanner lived in Paris with Solano, who put away her own literary aspirations to be Flanner's personal secretary. Even though the relationship was not monogamous, they lived together for over 50 years.

She was a frequent visitor to Los Angeles because her mother, Mary Flanner, lived at 530 East Marigold St. in Altadena with her sister, poet Hildegarde Flanner, and brother-in-law, Frederick Monhoff.

Flanner was a chain smoker.

In 1975, she returned to New York City permanently to be cared for by Natalia Danesi Murray. Flanner died on November 7, 1978. She was cremated, and her ashes were scattered along with Murray's over Cherry Grove in Fire Island where the two had met in 1940, according to William Murray, Danesi Murray's son, in his book Janet, My Mother, and Me.

In popular culture 
 Solita Solano and Flanner are portrayed as "Nip" and "Tuck" in the 1928 novel Ladies Almanack, by Djuna Barnes, a roman à clef about the amorous intrigues of the lesbian network centered in Natalie Clifford Barney's salon in Paris.
Flanner is among the journalists cited as inspirations for the 2021 Wes Anderson film "The French Dispatch".
Flanner is briefly mentioned in Season 1 Episode 4 of Fran Lebowitz' Netflix series Pretend It's a City.

Bibliography

Books

 The Cubical City: A Novel (1926)
 Paris Was Yesterday, 1925–1939, edited by Irving Drutman (1972)
 An American in Paris: Profile of an Interlude Between Two Wars (1940)
 Pétain: The Old Man of France (1944)
 London Was Yesterday, 1939–1945, edited by Irving Drutman (1975)
 Men & Monuments: Profiles of Picasso, Matisse, Braque, & Malraux (1957)
 Paris Journal, 1944–1965, edited by William Shawn (1965)
 Later published separately as Paris Journal, 1944–1955 and Paris Journal, 1956–1964
 Paris Journal, 1965–1970, edited by William Shawn  (1971)
 Janet Flanner's World: New and Uncollected Pieces, 1932–1975, edited by Irving Drutman (1979)
 Darlinghissima: Letters to a Friend, edited by Natalia Danesi Murray (1986)
 Conversation Pieces, an autobiographical book by illustrator Constantin Alajalov with text and commentary by Flanner (1942)
 Paris est une guerre : 1940-1945, translated from English by Hélène Cohen, forward by Michèle Fitoussi Editions du sous-sol, 2020. (New Yorker columns, in French)

'Letter from ...' in The New Yorker

References

Further reading

Biographies
 Zwanzig Jahre Paris. Die Zeit, 45, 1967
 Brenda Wineapple : Genet: A Biography of Janet Flanner. University of Nebraska Press 1992, 
 Maren Gottschalk (de) Der geschärfte Blick – Sieben Journalistinnen und ihre Lebensgeschichte. Beltz und Gelberg, Weinheim 2001,

External links
 
 
 
 
 Flanner at Women Come to the Front, Library of Congress Exhibition
 
 Flanner at Our Land, Our Literature
 Flanner at The Living Room
 

1892 births
1978 deaths
20th-century American novelists
Bisexual women
Modernist women writers
The New Yorker staff writers
Writers from Indianapolis
National Book Award winners
American LGBT journalists
LGBT people from Indiana
Journalists from Indiana
The Indianapolis Star people
American women novelists
American LGBT novelists
American expatriates in France
20th-century American women writers
American columnists
Novelists from Indiana
20th-century American non-fiction writers
American women war correspondents
American women columnists
Park Tudor School alumni
20th-century American journalists
20th-century American LGBT people
Members of the American Academy of Arts and Letters
American bisexual writers